Epichloë sinensis is a hybrid asexual species in the fungal genus Epichloë. 

A systemic and seed-transmissible grass symbiont first described in 2020,  Epichloë sinensis is a natural allopolyploid of Epichloë sibirica and Epichloë typhina subsp. poae.

Epichloë sinensis is found in Asia, specifically Northwest China, where it has been identified in the grass species Festuca sinensis.

References 

sinensis
Fungi described in 2020
Fungi of China